San Miguel Los Lotes is a former village on the border of the Escuintla Department and Sacatepéquez Department of Guatemala.

It was buried by a pyroclastic flow during the 2018 Volcán de Fuego eruption on 3 June 2018.

References

Populated places in the Escuintla Department
Former villages